Timur Vadimovich Ivanov (Russian: Тимур Вадимович Иванов; born on 15 August 1975), is a Russian statesman and army officer, who is currently the Deputy Minister of Defense since 23 May 2016. He is also an acting State Advisor of the Russian Federation, 1st class, and a candidate of economic sciences.

Biography

Timur Ivanov was born on 15 August 1975 in Moscow. His father, Vadim Gennadyevich, is the general director of Crystal Development LLC since 2004, while his mother is of Lezgian descent, as she is originally from the Kurakhsky district of Dagestan.

In 1997, Ivanov graduated from the Faculty of Computational Mathematics and Cybernetics of the Moscow State University. M.V. Lomonosov. From 1997 to 1999, he worked in various commercial organizations. From 1999 to 2012, he worked at enterprises of the fuel and energy complex of Russia. He hold his academic degree: a candidate of economic sciences (dissertation "Financial and organizational models of NPP construction projects" under the direction of Aleksandr Karyakin was defended in Ivanovo in 2011).

In 2012, he served as Deputy Prime Minister of the Moscow Oblast, under governor Sergei Shoigu. From 2013 to 2016, he was the General Director of Oboronstroy JSC, a subordinate to the Russian Ministry of Defense.

On 23 May 2016, by decree of the President of Russia, Ivanov was appointed Deputy Minister of Defense of the Russia. In the Ministry of Defense, he oversees issues related to property management and quartering of troops, housing and medical support of the Russian Armed Forces, and is responsible for the construction, reconstruction and overhaul of facilities of the Russian Ministry of Defense and military mortgages.

During the COVID-19 pandemic in Russia in 2020, he supervised the construction of 16 multifunctional medical centers of the Ministry of Defense for the treatment of patients with COVID-19.

On 27 December 2021, following Yevgeny Zinichev's death, there are rumors that Ivanov would be the next official minister of emergency situations.

Family

He is married to his second wife, Svetlana Zakharova (born 1971), since 2010. Svetlana is an entrepreneur, and owns Metropol Fashion Group. She is a former host of the program "Take it off immediately!" on STS.

They have two daughters Daria (born 2010) and Praskovya (born 2018). Svetlana's children from her first marriage were daughter Alekesndra (born 1998), and son Mikhail (born 2003).

References

1975 births
21st-century Russian economists
Living people
Economists from Moscow
Military personnel from Moscow
1st class Active State Councillors of the Russian Federation
Deputy Defence Ministers of Russia
Knights of the Ordre national du Mérite
Recipients of the Medal of the Order "For Merit to the Fatherland" I class
Recipients of the Order "For Merit to the Fatherland", 3rd class
Recipients of the Order "For Merit to the Fatherland", 4th class
Recipients of the Order of Saint Righteous Grand Duke Dmitry Donskoy, 1st class
Russian economists
Anti-Ukrainian sentiment in Russia